James John “Jim” Murphy (October 4, 1868 - September 26, 1951) served in the California legislature and was born in Canada. He was a part of the California's 1st State Assembly district and served from January 5, 1925 – January 7, 1929.
After his first term, he resigned telling his constituents,"Sacramento is no place for an honest Man"

References

Republican Party members of the California State Assembly
1868 births
1951 deaths